Adda is a 2013 Telugu action film directed by G. S. Karthik Reddy and jointly produced by Chintalapudi Srinivasarao and Sushanth's mother, Anumolu Naga Susheela, under Sri Nag Corporation. It featured Sushanth and Shanvi in the lead roles.

Plot
Abhi (Sushanth) is a young man who provides a unique service - that of creating rifts between couples. He provides this service mostly to the couples’ parents. He builds crevices between lovebirds who plan to marry against the wishes of their parents and gets paid big bucks for his services. But when he wants to, he also helps those in love and even helps them get married.

The marriage registration office is his Adda or office and he operates from there. Into this playboy's life enters Priya (Shanvi), and she seeks the help of Abhi to separate her sister and her boyfriend because her father Patel (Nagineedu) does not approve of their relationship and will go to any lengths to punish them. So she decides to break them up using Abhi's services.

In the process of a breakup, Abhi falls in love with Priya. However, Priya keeps off Abhi as he is too money-minded. She feels Abhi is a guy without feelings and morals. Also, she is engaged to be married to her cousin, Deva  (Dev Gill). The rest of the film shows how Abhi chases her and gets her to fall for him.

Cast

Sushanth as Abhinav
Shanvi as Priya
Dev Gill as Deva, Priya's cousin
Kota Srinivasa Rao
Raghu Babu 
Thagubothu Ramesh
Dhanraj
Tanikella Bharani
Venu Madhav
Nagineedu as Patel
Nalla Venu
Swapnika
Sudigali Sudheer 
Jaya Prakash Reddy (cameo appearance)
Suhasini as Pooja
Srinivas Avasarala as Kishore
Fish Venkat
Randhir Gattla
Shweta Bhardwaj (item song "Pareshan Hay Oolala")

Production
Nagasusheela, Chintalapudi Srinivasa Rao are jointly produced the film on Sri Nag Corporation banner.

Filming
Film was launched on 28 July 2012 in Annapurna Studios at Hyderabad and Nagarjuna gave the clap, ANR switched on the camera and Puri Jagannadh directed the first shot. The first schedule of the film completed on 14 August 2012 The second schedule of the film was started on 16 August 2012 in Ramoji Film City, and the unit of the film was canned few important scenes on Sushanth, Shanvi and others. It was reported that on 1 January 2013 the talkie part of the film completed. Shweta Bhardwaj played an item song with Sushanth for this film. The song was shot in Annapurna Seven Acres studios.

Casting
Shanvi played a role as a fashion designing student in this film.

Sound Track
The title song of this film (Yehi Hai Mera Adda) was released at IPL match during the match between Sunrisers Hyderabad and Royal Challengers Bangalore on 7 April 2013 at the Uppal Hyderabad, which was composed by Anoop Rubens and sung by Baba Sehgal. The song was launched formally in the presence of Sushanth director Sai Karthik Reddy producers Nagasusheela and Chintalapudi Srinivasa Rao.

Track list
The film's music was composed by Anup Rubens and Released by Junglee Music.

Marketing
The first look poster of the film Adda was launched on 18 Mar 2013.

The promotional video of the film Adda was launched on 5 May 2013.

Release
The film was released on 15 August 2013.

Reception
Jeevi of idlebrain.com gave a rating of 3/5 stating that The comedy and entertainment in the film is good. Plus points of the film are Sushanth, entertainment and music. howis.co.in rated this movie 2 out of 5. The rating has calculated by average rating of all popular Tollywood critic websites ratings

References

External links

2010s Telugu-language films
2013 films
Indian action films
Films scored by Anoop Rubens
Films shot in Hyderabad, India
Films shot at Ramoji Film City
2013 action films